The Women competition at the 2019 World Allround Speed Skating Championships was held on 2 and 3 March 2019.

Results

500 m
The race was started on 2 March at 12:00.

3000 m
The race was started on 2 March at 13:05.

1500 m
The race was started on 3 March at 12:00.

5000 m
The race was started on 3 March at 13:38.

Overall standings
After all events.

References

Women